Hawley Products Company is a manufacturer of loudspeaker components.  The company is the oldest manufacturer of loudspeaker diaphragms in the world.  Historically, the company produced a variety of products composed of fibrous or plastic materials, including helmets, globes, microwave trays, automotive components, suitcases, and furniture.  Most notably, the company is remembered for its World War II military helmets and helmet liners used by soldiers in the United States Army, Marines, and Navy.  Hawley Products is the original designer of the M1 steel helmet liner.  The company is also one of the two original manufacturers of the M1 steel helmet liner, alongside General Fibre Company.  Additionally, Hawley Products designed and manufactured several versions of the pressed fiber military sun helmet used by the US military during World War II.  The military continued to use this sun helmet throughout most of the 20th century, including Naval personnel during the Persian Gulf War.

History

First location and early company history

The company was founded in 1917 in Geneva, Illinois by Jesse Hawley.  However, Hawley's participation in the company was limited in the early years of the company due to the shifting commitments of Hawley's college football coaching career.  The company was incorporated following Hawley's years coaching football at the University of Iowa from 1910 to 1915.  Subsequently, two years into the company's founding, Hawley accepted an adviser role with Dartmouth's football program in 1919. This eventually led to his promotion to head coach of the Dartmouth football team from 1923 to 1928, a position he accepted for free without salary.

Hawley Products built the Newcomb Hawley factory in St. Charles, Illinois at 333 North 6th Street.  The factory also served as the headquarters of the company, which produced military sun helmets and M1 steel helmet liners for the US military during World War II.

Under Jesse Hawley, the company invested heavily in research and innovation.  During the 1930s, Jesse and his brother Don Hawley personally designed and patented products for the company.  Dr. John C. Williams headed the Hawley Products research division in the 1940s and 1950s.

New markets, expansion, and acquisition

Jesse Hawley managed the company until his death in 1946, at which time his brother and fellow executive, Don M. Hawley, became president of Hawley Products.  Don Hawley was also an inventor of several of the products and methods of production at the company.  By 1946, Hawley Products had expanded its product lines into plastics, sound diaphragms, molded fiber, and filters.

In 1967, Hawley Products was acquired by Hitco Inc.

Recent operations
In 1984, Hawley Products relocated to Paducah, Kentucky from St. Charles, Illinois.  The company moved into a new 74,000 square foot facility, focusing on the production of  paper and cloth components for loudspeakers.  Hawley Products presently produces surrounds, spiders, and diaphragms.  The diaphragms include paper, kevlar, carbon fiber, and polypropylene based versions.

Products

Helmets

Sun helmet

In 1935, Jesse Hawley invented and patented a tropical shaped, fiber pressed, commercial sun helmet.  Although Hawley's helmet was originally designed for civilian use, including being marketed to the Boys Scouts of America as the Hawley trooper. Although the Hawley trooper was directly sold to Scouts by the Boys Scouts of America, the sun hat never replaced the official Scout hat.

The United States military adopted the sun helmet design in 1940.  Hawley Products and the International Hat Company won military contracts to manufacture hundreds of thousands of the pressed fiber sun helmet.

M1 helmet liner

The original design for the M1 helmet was approved by the United States military on June 9th, 1941.  The helmet shell, known as the Hadfield manganese steel helmet, was first manufactured by the McCord Radiator Company, whereas the fiber liner interior was designed and produced by Hawley Products Company.  The purpose of the Hawley liner was to serve as a cushion between the wearer and the steel shell.  The fiber material interior consisted of a finished green cardboard, with an interior suspension.  The interior suspension was shaped as a webbed crossing pattern.

See also

International Hat Company
General Fibre Company
Sun helmet

References

Bibliography and further reading

External links

Hawley Products Company advertisement housed at the St. Charles, Illinois Museum
Recommendation to Approve Installation of Downtown Partnership Historic Signs

Manufacturing companies established in 1917
Helmet manufacturers
Hat companies
Privately held companies of the United States
Privately held companies based in Illinois